The Turenki railway station (formerly Turengi) is located in the municipality of Janakkala, Finland, in the urban area and municipal seat of Turenki. It is located along the Riihimäki–Tampere railway, and its neighboring stations are Hämeenlinna in the north and Ryttylä in the south.

Services 

Southbound trains toward Riihimäki and Helsinki use track 1, while northbound trains toward Hämeenlinna and Tampere use track 3. Track 2 has no platform and is only used by long-distance trains that pass through the station.

References 

Janakkala
Railway stations in Kanta-Häme